Seabee Mine Aerodrome  is located near Laonil Lake and serves the Seabee Gold Mine in Saskatchewan, Canada.

See also 
 List of airports in Saskatchewan

References 

Registered aerodromes in Saskatchewan